The Retiree Drug Subsidy Program is a program offered by the Centers for Medicare & Medicaid Services (CMS) to reimburse health plan sponsors (municipalities, unions and private employers) for a portion of their eligible expenses for retiree prescription drug benefits. This enables Plan Sponsors to continue providing drug coverage to their Medicare-eligible retirees at a lower cost.

Benefits of the RDS Program for participating Plan Sponsors include:
 A Federal subsidy equal to 28-percent Qualifying Covered Retiree's costs for prescription drugs otherwise covered by Medicare Part D that are attributable to such drug costs between the applicable Cost Threshold and Cost Limit
 Incurred costs (including dispensing fees) that the Health Plan Sponsor pays, and that the retiree pays, are eligible for subsidy. Rebates received are subtracted from the amount eligible for subsidy.
 Program flexibility that supports the Health Plan Sponsor's current prescription drug plan structure
 Extensive educational materials and support

To qualify for the subsidy, a Health Plan Sponsor must show that its coverage is "actuarially equivalent" to, or at least as generous as, the defined standard Medicare Part D coverage.

References

Medicare and Medicaid (United States)
Subsidies